Chyhyryn Raion was a raion (district) of Cherkasy Oblast, central Ukraine. Its administrative centre was located at the town of Chyhyryn. The raion was abolished on 18 July 2020 as part of the administrative reform of Ukraine, which reduced the number of raions of Cherkasy Oblast to four. The area of Chyhyryn Raion was merged into Cherkasy Raion. The last estimate of the raion population was 

At the time of disestablishment, the raion consisted of two hromadas, Chyhyryn urban hromada with the administration in Chyhyryn and Medvedivka rural hromada with the administration in the selo of Medvedivka.

During the Ukrainian War of Independence the region was proclaimed the "Kholodny Yar Republic" (led by local Vasyl Chuchupak) which strived for Ukrainian independence from the Soviet Union. The Kholodny Yar Republic lasted from 1919 to 1922.

References

Former raions of Cherkasy Oblast
1923 establishments in Ukraine
Ukrainian raions abolished during the 2020 administrative reform